Peter Eric Jackson was Chief Scientist and head of R&D at Thomson Reuters. He was born in 1949 in Bridgetown, Barbados, and graduated from Leeds University, UK, with a Ph.D. in Artificial Intelligence. He died August 3, 2011, aged 62, at home in Burnsville, Minnesota, USA.

Publications
 Introduction to Expert Systems, Addison Wesley (1986, 1992, 1999) 
 Logic-Based Knowledge Representation, MIT Press (1989)
 Natural Language Processing for Online Applications, John Benjamins (2002, 2007)

References

External links
 Official website (via archive.org)
 Thomson Reuters' Brain, Twin Cities Business, November 2009.

Artificial intelligence researchers
Alumni of the University of Leeds
2011 deaths
People from Burnsville, Minnesota
People from Bridgetown
1949 births